Mehmet Uluğ (13 April 1959 – 20 November 2013) was a Turkish businessman, promoter and music curator. He is best known as the founder of Turkey’s leading concert, festival and live show company Pozitif, record label Doublemoon and music club Babylon.

Early life 
Uluğ was born in Istanbul as the eldest of two children of Semra Uluğ and Şahap Uluğ. Uluğ graduated from Robert College in 1978 after being educated at Yeşilköy Primary School and British High School. Uluğ attended Clemson University in the United States of America, completing his educational life in 1984 with an undergraduate and graduate degree in Electrical Engineering.

Career 

Uluğ worked in Baltimore as a research engineer between 1984 and 1987. In 1988 moved from the US and after a 6-month-long trip to the Far East, he returned to Turkey. Dreaming of building a bridge between jazz music and Turkish music listeners and adding a new dimension to Istanbul’s very static cultural state, Uluğ chose to march in a more unconventional path than building a career in engineering.
 
In 1988, Uluğ founded Turkey’s biggest music and event company Pozitif along with his highschool friend Cem Yegül. In 1989, Uluğ’s brother, Ahmet Uluğ joined this duo forming the partnership that continued for 25 years until Mehmet Uluğ’s death.
 
Beginning from its early years, Pozitif was one of the important building blocks in Turkey’s music and artistic event arena. Being the leader in transforming Istanbul’s cultural scene with its events, Pozitif team organized Turkey’s biggest and most inclusive festivals such as Akbank Jazz Festival, Blues Festival, One Love Festival and Rock’n Coke. Uluğ’s dream festival Cappadox was brought to life one year after his death, in Kapadokya.
 
Aside from the festivals, in the period of Uluğ’s management, Pozitif team brought together the Turkish audience with many megastars like U2, Rihanna, Red Hot Chili Peppers, world renown shows like Cirque Du Soleil and the avant garde artists of the alternative world Patti Smith, Cecil Taylor and John Zorn.
 
Uluğ’s most important venture under the framework of Pozitif was to establish -the most known club to be- Babylon. Being a very uninhabited neighbourhood in the year the club was founded (1999), Asmalımescit rapidly transformed into a lively district with the leadership of Babylon. From the day Babylon opened its doors, the club welcomed many local and international artists from various disciplinaries. Uluğ carried his passion for “good music” with the help of Babylon to Alaçatı and Çeşme leading the foundation of Babylon Çeşme and Babylon Alaçatı. Uluğ contributed to the organization of Babylon Soundgarden Festival, publishing of Babylon Magazine and Radio Babylon.
 
Another enterprise of Uluğ was the creation of the independent record label Doublemoon Records with the Pozitif team in 1998. With the aim of bringing together music from different roots, Uluğ worked on 13 important albums as the executive producer and published more than 50 albums with his partners.

Albums as executive producer

Personal life 
Uluğ’s son Ali Uluğ was born in 1998. In 2009 he met the love of his life, Ana Fortes, a Brazilian graphic designer and her two daughters, Antonia and Olivia, which he adopted with his heart. The five of them lived 
internationally very happy together, being a pretty funny and beautiful family in their own way. 
Diagnosed with cancer in 2012, he died of the disease on November 20, 2013.
Memo was and still is an amazing, stunningly beautiful, generous and caring person that will always remain in our hearts, thoughts and happy memories.

References 

 Mehmet Uluğ hayatını kaybetti
 Artık Babylon'daki her konserde içimizde dolmayacak bir boşluk
 Müzik sustu!
 Mehmet Uluğ'un anısına, saygıyla
 Mehmet Uluğ toprağa verildi
 Mehmet Uluğ ile Akbank Caz Festivali Ropörtajı
 Mehmet Uluğ, Ahmet Uluğ ve Cem Yegül 20. yılında Babylon'u anlatıyor
 Çatısız marangozhane 4 yılda dünyanın en iyi caz kulüplerinden biri oldu
 20 yılda 2 binden fazla konser yaptı hedefi 30 milyon dolara çıkardı
 20. yılda bir dünya projesi
 Babylon artık dünya markası
 Mehmet Uluğ: Hayal bile edemezdik gerçek oldu
 Babylon'da 20 yıllık "Pozitif" enerji
 Ahmet Uluğ & Mehmet Uluğ Pozitif ortakları
 20 öncü yıl
 Asmalımescit'in hayat öpücüğü
 Onlar yazdı mı meşhur oluyor
 Caz starını önce ithal sonra imal ettiler, sıra ihracatta

Turkish businesspeople
2013 deaths
1959 births
Deaths from cancer in Turkey
Deaths from pancreatic cancer